Çakır is a new generation cruise missile that can be launched from land, sea and air platforms with a range of more than , designed by Turkish rocket and missile manufacturer Roketsan. It was introduced with the launch of Roketsan Ankara Lalahan facilities on 31 March 2022.   On the same day, a video about the missile was shared on the Twitter account of Roketsan.

The targets of Çakır include surface targets, land and surface targets close to the shore, strategic land targets, field targets and caves. It is aimed to make the first firing from the UAV Bayraktar Akıncı towards the end of 2022, and to perform the platform integration in 2023.

The missile, which can act in coordination with different platforms thanks to its network-based data link, allows route update, target change and mission cancellation during flight depending on the user's choice. It also has the ability to dodge while cruising. The missile, which has terrain following technology, can fly close to the water surface. It uses the KTJ-1750 turbojet engine developed by the Turkish defense research company Kale Arge.

Technical specifications

 Length: 
 Length incl. booster: 
 Diameter: 
 Weight: 
 Weight incl. booster: 
 Warhead weight: 
 Warhead type: High Explosive, semi-Armor Piercing Particle Effect, Thermobaric
 Engine: Kale Arge KTJ-1750 Turbojet
 Booster: Solid propellant
 Range: +
 Cruising speed: 
 Data link: network-based

Variants
Çakır is a family of weapons as it will be offered in many variants with Infrared homing, radio frequency–guided or hybrid warheads and can be launched from all platforms, namely ships.

Variants of the Çakır family are:
 Çakır CR, Cruise missile
 Çakır AS, Anti-ship missile
 Çakır LIR, Electronic warfare
 Çakır SW, Swarming

See also
 Bora (missile)
 Atmaca

References

Çakır
Cruise missiles of Turkey